{{Infobox comics team and title 

|name                = Micronauts
|image               = Micronauts-1.jpg
|imagesize           = 
|caption             = Cover art of Micronauts #1 (January 1979). From left to right: Acroyear, Arcturus Rann, Marionette and Bug. Baron Karza in background. Art by Dave Cockrum and Al Milgrom.
|publisher           = Marvel ComicsImage ComicsDevil's Due PublishingIDW Publishing
|group               = y
|debuthead           = 
|debut               = Micronauts #1
|debutmo             = January
|debutyr             = 1979
|debuthead#          = 
|creators            = Bill Mantlo (writer)Michael Golden (artist)
|type                = Team
|business            = 
|organisation        = 
|organization        = y
|team                = 
|base                = Microverse
|owners              = 
|employees           = 
|members             = 
|fullroster          =

|title               = Micronauts
|cvr_image           = 
|cvr_caption         = 
|schedule            = Monthly
|format              = MicronautsMicronauts: The New Voyagesongoing seriesX-Men and the MicronautsMicronauts (vol. 3)Micronauts: KarzaMicronauts (vol. 4)limited series
|limited             = 
|ongoing             = 
|1shot               = 
|Superhero               = y
|pub_series          = 
|1stishhead          = Micronauts
|1stishyr            = 1979
|1stishmo            = January
|endishyr            = 1984
|endishmo            = August 
|1stishhead1         = The X-Men and the Micronauts
|1stishyr1           = 1984
|1stishmo1           = January 
|endishyr1           = 1984
|endishmo1           = April 
|1stishhead2         = Micronauts: The New Voyages
|1stishyr2           = 1984
|1stishmo2           = October 
|endishyr2           = 1986
|endishmo2           = May 
|1stishhead3         = Micronauts vol. 3
|1stishyr3           = 2002
|1stishmo3           = January 
|endishyr3           = 2003
|endishmo3           = September 
|1stishhead4         = Micronauts: Karza
|1stishyr4           = 2003
|1stishmo4           = February
|endishyr4           = 2003
|endishmo4           = May
|1stishhead5         = Micronauts vol. 4
|1stishyr5           = 2004
|1stishmo5           = January
|endishyr5           = 2004
|endishmo5           = May
|issues              = Micronauts59X-Men and the Micronauts4Micronauts: The New Voyages20Micronauts (vol. 3)11Micronauts: Karza4Micronauts (vol. 4)3
|main_char_team      = Arcturus RannMarionetteBugAcroyear
|writers             = {{List collapsed|MicronautsBill MantloX-Men and the MicronautsChris ClaremontBill MantloMicronauts: The New VoyagesPeter B. GillisMicronauts (vol. 3)Scott WherleMicronauts: KarzaJim KruegerMicronauts (vol. 4)Dan Jolley}}
|artists             = 
|pencillers          = {{List collapsed|Micronauts Michael Golden, Howard Chaykin, Pat Broderick, Keith Giffen, Greg LaRocque, Gil Kane; Jackson Guice; Kelley Jones X-Men and the MicronautsJackson GuiceMicronauts: The New VoyagesKelley JonesMicronauts (vol. 3)Eric HansonMicronauts: KarzaSteve KurthMicronauts (vol. 4)Pat Broderick}}
|inkers              = 
|letterers           = 
|colorists           = 
|editors             = 
|creative_team_month = 
|creative_team_year  = 
|creators_series     = 
|TPB                 = Revolution
|ISBN                = 1-58240-311-2
|nonUS               =

|cat                 = teams
|subcat              = Marvel Comics
|altcat              = 
|hero                = y
|villain             = Baron Karza
|sortkey             = Micronauts
|addpubcat1          = Image Comics limited series
|addpubcat2          = Devil's Due Publishing titles
}}The Micronauts are comic books featuring a group of characters based on the Mego Micronauts toy line. The first title was published by Marvel Comics in 1979, with both original characters and characters based on the toys. Marvel published two Micronauts series, mostly written by Bill Mantlo, until 1986, well after the toy line was cancelled in 1980. In the 2000s, Image Comics and Devil's Due Publishing each briefly published their own Micronauts series. Byron Preiss Visual Publications also published three paperback novels based on the Micronauts. In 2016, IDW Publishing published a new comic book series. A live-action film version of the Micronauts was in development by Hasbro Studios and Paramount in 2015.

Publication history

Marvel Comics 
The Micronauts began life as comic book characters thanks to a fortuitous accident on Christmas 1977. Marvel Comics writer Bill Mantlo's son Adam opened a new present, a line of the Mego Corporation's Micronauts action figures. Seeing the toys, Mantlo was instantly struck by inspiration to write their adventures. Convincing then Editor-in-chief Jim Shooter to get the comics license for these toys, Mantlo was hired to script their series.

The first series of the Micronauts ran from January 1979 to August 1984 and included 59 issues and two Annuals. The series was written by Bill Mantlo and featured art by Michael Golden. Other artists on the series included Howard Chaykin, Steve Ditko, Rich Buckler, Pat Broderick, Val Mayerik, Keith Giffen, Greg LaRocque, Gil Kane, Luke McDonnell, Mike Vosburg, Butch Guice, and Kelley Jones. Micronauts, along with Moon Knight and Ka-Zar the Savage, became one of Marvel's first ongoing series to be distributed exclusively to comic book stores beginning with issue #38 (Feb. 1982).

In the United Kingdom, The Micronauts was first included as a supporting strip in Marvel UK's Star Wars Weekly comic in January 1979 for several months and then in the first nine issues of Star Heroes Pocketbook, alongside Battlestar Galactica, before joining the new Future Tense reprint anthology. Unlike the U.S. version, these strips were printed in black and white.

The Micronauts Special Edition five-issue limited series (December 1983-April 1984) reprinted issues #1–12 and a back-up feature from #25. The X-Men and the Micronauts four-issue limited series (January 1984–April 1984) was co-written by Mantlo and Chris Claremont and drawn by Butch Guice.

The second volume of Micronauts, subtitled The New Voyages, was published from October 1984 to May 1986 and ran 20 issues. The series was written by Peter B. Gillis and featured early-career artwork by Kelley Jones. After this series the Marvel-owned license lapsed.

From the late 1990s the characters Marionette, Arcturus Rann and Bug (all Marvel properties) have appeared in various Marvel titles (without referencing the Micronauts label). Bug has appeared in a solo one-shot and together with cosmic hero Star-Lord, as part of a new incarnation of the Guardians of the Galaxy.

Image Comics
In June 2002, a new series by Image Comics was published for eleven issues before its cancellation in September 2003. The same year saw a four-issue limited series featuring Baron Karza's origin and his relationship with the Time Traveler entity.

Devil's Due Publishing
In March 2004, a new series was launched by Devil's Due Publishing, mixing new characters with those based on the toy line. The series ran for three issues and featured art by former Micronauts artist Pat Broderick. More issues were solicited, but never appeared on shelves despite some cover art being released.

IDW Publishing
In 2015, IDW Publishing acquired publishing rights from Hasbro to produce new comic books for the Micronauts and Rom the Spaceknight, both formerly popularized by Marvel as licensed properties. IDW released the first issue of their Micronauts series in April 2016, with scripts by Cullen Bunn and art by David Baldeon. The comic ran for eleven issues from 2016 to 2017. It was followed by two five-issue miniseries Micronauts: Wrath of Karza and Rom & the Micronauts which were released between 2017 and 2018.

Fictional team history

Marvel Comics version
The Micronauts originate in the Microverse, a microscopic universe full of strange planets like the human-inhabited Homeworld which is made up of diverse spherical habitats that are linked together in the fashion of a molecular chain. The original team comes together in response to the threat posed by Baron Karza, former bearded and balding academic turned murderous immortal black-armored dictator, who gained control of Homeworld through the creation of the Body Banks, where life-extending brain transplants are performed on the rich and inhuman genetic alterations on the poor.

Commander Arcturus Rann returned from a thousand-year deep space voyage in suspended animation with Biotron, his robot co-pilot on the HMS (Homeworld Micro Ship) Endeavor, to discover Karza has slain the royal family, descendants of Rann's parents Dallan and Sepsis who are now worshiped as virtual gods. What follows is an epic war across the Microverse pitting Rann and his allies against Karza.

In addition to Biotron, Rann's team of "Micronauts" includes Princess Mari of Homeworld, who, with her brother Prince Argon, are the only survivors of the slaughtered royal family of Homeworld. Known to the team as Marionette, she falls in love with Rann and leads the team on occasion. The alien gladiators Acroyear and Bug also join Rann's cause, and although completely different - one a noble armor-clad warrior prince and the other a wisecracking insectoid thief - the two become best friends and staunch allies of all Micronauts. The last member of the original team is Microtron, Mari's robot tutor. Although small, Microtron is a very resourceful R2-D2-style character and very supportive of all team members.

Warping through the Spacewall, an energy barrier between the Microverse and our much larger universe, and becoming trapped for a time on Earth where they enlarge to the size of action figures, the team encounter the to-them giant-sized Florida teenager Steve Coffin, his ex-astronaut father Ray (who is briefly transformed into the first Captain Universe), the Man-Thing and the evil cyborg scientist Professor Prometheus before returning to the Microverse.

After a series of battles against Karza (who, among his many other powers, can turn into a centaur and fire his fists like rockets) and his genetically-engineered army of vicious and obedient Dog Soldiers, the Micronauts triumph and Karza is apparently killed. Rann is able to claim victory due to the possession of the Enigma Force - a semi-sentient power source that bonded with him during his period of suspended animation and appeared in the form of floating, glowing green entities known as the Time Travelers - which enables him to perform incredible feats. The team then encounters the superhero team the Fantastic Four, who have traveled to a different region of the Microverse to battle the villain Psycho-Man. Bug's love, Jasmine, is killed during the climax of the battle. It is shortly after this encounter that the Micronauts again become trapped on Earth, at a greatly reduced size.

After encounters with the villains Plantman and Molecule Man, the team battle Mentallo and the Fixer, who have allied themselves with the organization HYDRA. Joined by one of Acroyear's people - Dagon - the team discovers that the villains and HYDRA are secretly under the control of Baron Karza, who is able to resurrect himself by placing his mind in Prince Argon's body. Argon was also converted to a cyborg centaur by the Body Banks, which combined him with his horse Oberon. Although the organization S.H.I.E.L.D. and several representatives of the races of the Microverse help the Micronauts finally defeat Karza, the battle is costly. Biotron is destroyed by Dagon, who is revealed to be an agent of Karza; the Queen of Kaliklak, Bug's home planet, dies in battle; Rann is rendered comatose and Acroyear's traitorous albino brother Prince Shaitan dies summoning the Worldmind - the parallel power to the Enigma Force that sustains their own home planet of Spartak. In desperation, Acroyear bonds with the Worldmind to defeat Karza, but in doing so destroys his world.

While trying to awaken Rann, the remnants of the team have an encounter with the demon Nightmare and accidentally discover that the Microverse is unraveling. A warning left in Rann's mind reveals that three keys will restore balance to the Microverse. The team embarks on a new quest across three new regions of the Microverse: Oceania, Polaria, and the Dead Zone. The Micronauts are eventually successful, and also acquire several teammates, including the bestial Devil and his companion Fireflyte and the robot Nanotron.

A new problem arises when Prince Argon, turning tyrant after donning the sacred white armor of the legendary Force Commander, begins displaying paranoia regarding the Micronauts, and eventually sends a special alien Death Squad to kill them. The Micronauts defeat the unit, and then encounter the mutant Nightcrawler and battle a new foe called Huntarr. Huntarr had been genetically engineered into a virtually indestructible living weapon by Argon to destroy the Micronauts, but Marionette makes him see that Argon is simply using him.

A war against Argon and his forces follows, with several beings from various locations in the Microverse - including Argon's ex-fiancee, the beautiful lowborn rebel leader Slug, and Prince Pharoid of Aegypta and his faithful lieutenant Margrave - joining the team in a bid to stop Argon. After several more encounters with beings such as the tyrant Doctor Doom the heroine the Wasp, and the villain Arcade, Microtron and Nanotron sacrifice themselves to reanimate Biotron's consciousness in the Micronauts' new vessel, the Bioship. Argon is finally revealed to be controlled by the spirit of Baron Karza, who returns once more.

Karza kills Argon and deals the Micronauts a crushing defeat by killing Devil, Pharoid, Slug and Margrave. After regrouping and a series of skirmishes, the remaining Micronauts confront and defeat Karza once and for all.

The Micronauts: The New Voyages
Weary of war, the surviving Micronauts leave behind the known Microverse (which they discover looking back resembles a galaxy shaped like a DNA Helix) and embark on a journey of exploration. They eventually discover the true nature of the Microverse and, in a final act that restores their ruined world, sacrifice themselves in order to repopulate the planets.

Team members 
 Acroyear - energy sword-wielding stoic and super-strong former ruler of the armor-clad Acroyears of the harsh and rocky planet Spartak.
 Biotron - tall & stalwart first of the part machine, part organic roboids who accompanied Arcturus Rann on his 1,000 year mission. The loyal and dependable co-pilot of the H.M.S. Endeavor was destroyed and later resurrected in giant form as a sentient starcraft known as the Bioship.
 Bug - a wisecracking master thief who is an antenna-headed green Insectivorid from the planet Kaliklak. Armed with his rocket-lance and as agile a wall-crawler as Spider-Man, Bug tends to "tik" when he talks and loves to eat snail-loaf.
 Cilicia - mother of Acroyear's child and his former betrothed who turned against him when he was forced to destroy Spartak in order to keep it out of enemy hands.
 Devil - highly intelligent and witty Beast-like member of a magenta red-furred race of savage cat-eared and dog-legged simioids from the jungles of Tropica on Homeworld.
 Fireflyte - tiny singing sprite who is part of a glowing, butterfly-winged fairy-like race which is linked to both the Enigma Force and the life cycle of Devil's species.
 Huntarr - formerly the rebellious slum youth Iann-23 who was mutated in the Body Banks and brainwashed into attacking the Micronauts. After being freed from Prince Argon's mental control, however, he joined the team so he could get revenge for being turned into a faceless, metal-booted monstrosity with the bio-based ability to grow weapons or whatever else required out of his hideous and highly malleable amber-hued body.
 Marionette - princess Mari, beautiful acrobatic rebel fighter who is the daughter of the slain rulers of Homeworld and sister of hero turned villain Prince Argon.
 Microtron - Marionette's loyal little personal roboid whose clever computer brain and extendable pincer arms always come in handy.
 Nanotron - small golden, one-eyed female roboid who served as Microtron's loving assistant.
Pharoid: Prince of Aegyptia (also known as Sand Zone) and keeper of the "star scepter". Loyal to the Micronauts' cause, he joins the fight to free all of the zones of the Homeworld.
 Arcturus Rann - heroic explorer and rotor-winged Space Glider who returned from a 1,000 year mission only to find his world taken over by his former teacher, Karza, who had become a Darth Vader-style despot while he was away.
 Scion - metallic-skinned descendant of the mysterious Makers and Savior of the Microverse. Originally found as an egg which radiated enough energy to power a spaceship, he hatched into a grotesque big-brained scorpion-like creature before first evolving into a handsome, winged humanoid and then into a powerful Prime Being whose every molecule would be reborn as an individual living being.
 Solitaire - a highly manipulative Prime Being with both metamorphic and healing powers, she first took the form of a green-skinned Insectivorid version of the lovely blond Marionette in order to seduce Bug so that he would help her get on the team. Solitaire then turned herself into a sexy, scantily-clad version of Commander Rann's dark-haired mother Sepsis.

The Microns
Years later Arcturus, Marionette and Bug (all Marvel properties) reappear as a team called the Microns. They aid the mutant Cable when the scientist Psycho-Man abducts the shape-changing Copycat. They battle Microverse inhabitant Baron Zebek of Aegyptus alongside the visiting super-team Alpha Flight and later assist Rick Jones and Captain Marvel during their adventures in the Microverse. In another largely untold tale, they also reteam with the X-Men against Baron Karza, who had recently been reborn, and his ally Thanos who seek to merge several of the sub-atomic universes. Arcturus Rann and Princess Mari became involved in the Psyklop invasion of K'ai, Jarella's homeworld.

Other versions
 In 1997, Marvel accepted a proposed reboot of Micronauts as a new series written by Shon C. Bury, penciled by Cary Nord and inked by Dan Green, using new character designs based on the original characters. Scripts were written for five issues and three issues were penciled, though Marvel was not granted the Micronauts license by the copyright holder, Abrams/Gentile Entertainment, forcing the series to be canceled.
 The Micronauts play a role in Marvel's Earth X series.

Collected editions
The first five-issue story arc of the Image series have been collected into a trade paperback:
 Micronauts Vol. 1: Revolution (112 pages, Image Publishing, June 2003)

In other media

Action figures
From 2005, AGE gave permission for SOTA (State of the Art) Toys to produce redesigned Micronauts action figures as Micronauts Evolution, with concept art by Randy Queen. SOTA president Jerry Macaluso expressed interest in a new comic based on the figures.

Animated television series
In 1998, AGE, Annex Entertainment, Gribouille and Kaleidoscope Media Group planned to produce a Micronauts animated series starting with a five-part miniseries to air on the Sci Fi Channel in Fall of 1998, followed by a syndicated 26 episode Micronauts animated series for 1999, with action figures and a Marvel tie-in comic announced. The project appears to be shelved or canceled.

Boulder Media (a subsidiary of Hasbro) planned to develop a new Micronauts animated series, but the project was delayed indefinitely as Hasbro sold Boulder Media to Australian media company Princess Pictures in 2022.

Films

Marvel Cinematic Universe
The Micronauts' homeworld the Microverse makes a featured appearance in the film, Ant-Man (2015). The dimension appears in a scene in which Scott Lang / Ant-Man goes subatomic in order to defeat the villain Darren Cross / Yellowjacket. Lang manipulates his suit to sabotage Darren's suit, and accidentally begins to continuously shrink into what Hank Pym calls the "Quantum Realm". While within the microverse, Lang sees glimpses of Pym's long-lost, presumed to be dead wife Janet van Dyne / Wasp (who had previously gone subatomic to destroy a Soviet nuclear missile). Previously believed to simply be one of Pym's theories, Lang's entrance into the Microverse is a key plot point and hints at the future of the Marvel Cinematic Universe's ventures into alternate dimensions and realities being largely explored in Doctor Strange (2016). Lang's escape from the dimension gives Pym hope that he may one day see his wife again. The realm appeared again in Ant-Man and the Wasp (2018) where Hank Pym finds his wife again and is successful in his mission. In Avengers: Endgame, Lang along with the team use the realm to travel back in time to get all 6 Infinity stones to reverse the effect from Thanos' snap.

Feature-film developments
 After Hasbro acquired the rights to the Micronauts toyline, Paramount Pictures in conjunction with J. J. Abrams was in negotiations to develop a movie version of the franchise in 2009. The planned project made little progress, though in November 2015, Paramount said that it was still planning a Micronauts film adaptation. Later in December, both Hasbro and Paramount were planning a cinematic universe combining Micronauts with G.I. Joe, Visionaries: Knights of the Magical Light, M.A.S.K. and Rom. Several writers, such as Michael Chabon, Brian K. Vaughan, Nicole Perlman, Lindsey Beer, Cheo Coker, John Francis Daley, Jonathan Goldstein, Joe Robert Cole, Jeff Pinkner, Nicole Riegel and Geneva Robertson-Dworet joined to the writers' room in April 2016. In 2019, Dean DeBlois was attached to write and direct the film. By November 2020, Paramount removed the film from its release schedule.

Novels
The 2002 Image Comics relaunch was followed the same year by Micronauts: The Time Traveler Trilogy, a collection of three paperback novels published by Byron Preiss Visual Publications and written by Steve Lyons.

See also
 Microverse
 Multiverse (Marvel Comics)

References

External links
 

1984 comics endings
1986 comics endings
2003 comics endings
2004 comics endings
Characters created by Bill Mantlo
Characters created by Michael Golden
Comics based on toys
Comics by Howard Chaykin
Hasbro characters
Works based on Takara Tomy toys
IDW Publishing titles
Image Comics titles

it:Micronauti